Tomás Alejandro Chancalay (born 1 January 1999) is an Argentine professional footballer who plays as a winger for Emirati club Al-Wasl, on loan from Racing Club.

Club career
Born in Viale, Entre Ríos, Chancalay joined Colón's youth setup in 2006, from hometown side Arsenal de Viale. On 10 February 2017, he signed his first professional contract with the club.

Promoted to the first team ahead of the 2017–18 campaign, Chancalay made his professional – and Primera División – debut on 26 August 2017, coming on as a second-half substitute for Nicolás Leguizamón in a 1–1 away draw against Rosario Central. In his next appearance on 8 September, he scored his first senior goal as Colón beat Arsenal de Sarandí away from home. He netted further goals against San Martín and Godoy Cruz in twenty-four total appearances in his first season, as Colón qualified for the 2018 Copa Sudamericana.

On 5 February 2021, Chancalay moved to Primera División side Racing, on a loan deal for the rest of the year, including a purchase option. Racing paid a fee of around 100,000 US dollars for the loan deal. On 14 January 2022, Racing triggered the purchase option, buying 50% of Cahncalay's pass for 1,250,000 dollars. The player signed a deal until the end of 2024. On 7 September 2022, Chancalay left Racing to join Emirati side Al-Wasl on a loan deal until June 2023.

International career
Chancalay was selected by the Argentina under-20s for the 2018 L'Alcúdia International Football Tournament, but was later removed after Colón chose to withdraw him. He had previously trained with the U20s, including against the full side at the 2018 FIFA World Cup. Chancalay was called up by Fernando Batista for the 2019 FIFA U-20 World Cup. He appeared in two matches at the tournament in Poland, as Argentina were eliminated by Mali on penalties after Chancalay missed the decisive spot-kick.

Career statistics
.

References

External links

1999 births
Living people
Argentine footballers
Argentine expatriate footballers
People from Paraná Department
Argentina youth international footballers
Argentina under-20 international footballers
Sportspeople from Entre Ríos Province
Association football wingers
Argentine Primera División players
UAE Pro League players
Club Atlético Colón footballers
Racing Club de Avellaneda footballers
Al-Wasl F.C. players
Argentine expatriate sportspeople in the United Arab Emirates
Expatriate footballers in the United Arab Emirates